Essen or von Essen is the surname  of a Baltic German and Swedish noble family.

History
The first known ancestor was Thomas von Essen (d. 1615–1627) who was from Lääne län in Estonia. His son Alexander von Essen received Swedish nobility, but was not introduced in the Swedish House of Nobility. His descendants, Reinhold Wilhelm von Essen (1669–1732) and Hans Henrik von Essen (1674–1729), were elevated to Baron in 1717 and 1719. Hans Henrik von Essen was later elevated to comital rank.

Another was Magnus Gustav von Essen (1759–1813), a Russian lieutenant general and military governor of Riga. Nikolai von Essen (1860-1915), Admiral of the Imperial Russian Navy, hailed from the Livonian branch of the family, but not Count Peter Essen who was born a commoner.

Notable family members
 Magnus Gustav von Essen  (1759–1813), Russian general
 Hans Henric von Essen (1775–1824), Swedish statesman
 Carl Gustaf von Essen (1815—1895), Finnish Pietistic priest
 Fredrik von Essen (1831–1921), Swedish baron, Marshal of the Realm, and Minister of Finance
 Siri von Essen (1850–1912), Finnish-Swedish actress
 Nikolai Ottovich von Essen (1860–1915), Russian admiral
 Thomas Von Essen (b. 1945), American civilian administrator, New York City Fire Commissioner
 Max von Essen (b. 1974), American actor and singer

References

Sources
This article is fully or partially based on material from Nordisk familjebok, 1904–1926.

Swedish noble families
Finnish noble families
Russian noble families
Baltic-German people
Essen family